Roberto Hernán Salvatierra (born October 28, 1984 in Bolívar) is an Argentine footballer who plays as a midfielder. He currently plays for Ferro Carril Oeste

External links
 
 
 

1984 births
Living people
Sportspeople from Buenos Aires Province
Argentine footballers
Argentine Primera División players
Club Atlético Banfield footballers
Club de Gimnasia y Esgrima La Plata footballers
Olimpo footballers
Ferro Carril Oeste footballers
Association football midfielders